, often called by the portmanteau nickname , is a Japanese singer, actor, radio host, concert director, dancer, and model. He is a member of the boy band Arashi, and produces Arashi's concerts. He is best known to Japanese television drama audiences for his portrayal as Dōmyōuji Tsukasa in the Hana Yori Dango series, in which he won GQ Japan's Man of the Year Award under the singer/actor category for his work in the drama.

Prior to his debut as a singer with Arashi in 1999, Matsumoto started an acting career when he was cast as Teddy Duchamp for the stage play Stand by Me, which was based on the film of the same name. Since then, he has gone on to appear in numerous dramas and movies, receiving a number of awards and nominations for his roles.

Early life
Matsumoto was born in Toshima, Tokyo, as the youngest child in his family. He has an older sister whose support of KinKi Kids influenced his decision to join Johnny & Associates in 1996. Thinking it might bode good luck, he sent his application to the agency on his elementary school graduation day and received a phone call weeks later from president Johnny Kitagawa himself, inviting him to attend a rehearsal instead of being auditioned. Due to this, Matsumoto is frequently referred to as one of the elite within the agency.

Music career

Although the majority of Matsumoto's solos for albums and concerts are written by Arashi's staff, he has contributed lyrics for some of his solos: "La Familia" for the 2004 Arashi! Iza, Now Tour!!, "Naked" in 2008 for the album Dream "A" Live under the pen name "Jun", and "Stay Gold" in 2014 for the album The Digitalian. He also supervised the song "DRIVE" in 2016 for the album Are You Happy? and took part in writing lyrics with other Arashi members as Arashi for their songs "Fight Song", "Energy Song - Zekkōchō Chō!!!!", "5×10", and "5×20".

Matsumoto began to be involved in concert production in 2000. He is officially credited as the director in the closing credits for the concerts Arashi Anniversary Tour 5×20 and Arafes 2020, and on the official website of Johnny's Festival Thank you 2021 Hello 2022 for the concert of the same name. Although he primarily focuses on Arashi concerts, he also gave advice on concert production to younger groups of Johnny & Associates, such as for Hey! Say! JUMP in 2014 and King & Prince in 2018, and in 2021, he is the director for the Johnny's Festival Thank you 2021 Hello 2022 concert, featuring many different groups from Johnny & Associates.

As a concert director, Matsumoto had also been conceptualizing new ideas for concert production. In 2005, he along with the concert staff team implemented the usage of the moving stage, which has been subsequently used by several Asian musical acts. 3 years prior to Arashi Live Tour 2014 The Digitalian, Matsumoto had been putting efforts into utilizing the idea of light color changing via bluetooth onto penlights, and the concept was successfully implemented in the previously mentioned concert.

Acting career

Stage
In 1997, Matsumoto was cast in his first stage play, which was based on the American coming of age film Stand by Me with future bandmates Masaki Aiba and Kazunari Ninomiya. He did not return to do any major stage productions for nearly seven years after Stand by Me, instead focusing on dramas and movies. However, in 2004, Matsumoto appeared in the stage play West Side Story with bandmates Satoshi Ohno and Sho Sakurai.

It was announced on July 21, 2011, that Matsumoto will star in Yukio Ninagawa's production play, which was his first stage play in five years.

Drama
Like bandmate Sakurai, Matsumoto made his acting debut as a television actor in April 1997 in the TBS drama special . A few months later, he co-starred with the members of KinKi Kids and future bandmate Masaki Aiba in the mystery-thriller series . In 1999, all the members of Arashi co-starred together for the first time in the volleyball-centered short drama .

Matsumoto made his breakthrough in 2001 when he was cast as Hajime Kinda'ichi in the third season of Kinda'ichi Shōnen no Jikenbo, taking over the role from Tsuyoshi Domoto and co-starring opposite Anne Suzuki.

Matsumoto gained further popularity as an actor in 2002, when he starred in the first season of Gokusen with Yukie Nakama, Shun Oguri, Tomohiro Waki, Hiroki Narimiya and Yuma Ishigaki. His portrayal of the troubled but highly intelligent student, Shin Sawada, drew acclaim and won him Best Supporting Actor at the 33rd Television Drama Academy Awards. He later returned with most of the original cast to star in the special epilogue episode in 2003. Soon after, his character also made a cameo in Sakurai's comedy series .

In 2003, Matsumoto took another high-profile role in the live-action adaptation of manga series Kimi wa Pet as Takeshi "Momo" Goda, starring opposite Koyuki.

In 2005, Matsumoto took the most prominent role of his career to date, when he was cast as Domyōuji Tsukasa in the live-action adaptation of shōjo manga Hana Yori Dango. Co-starring opposite Oguri again, and with Mao Inoue, Shota Matsuda and Tsuyoshi Abe, the series was a success with an average viewership rating of 19.6%. Matsumoto's portrayal as the air-headed and arrogant leader of four rich heirs won him Best Supporting Actor again at the 47th Television Drama Academy Awards. In 2007, due to the success of Hana Yori Dango, it spawned a second season, which was an even bigger hit with television audiences as it had a peak rating of 27.6% on the final episode and an overall rating of 21.57%. Matsumoto won Best Supporting Actor at the 10th Nikkan Sports Drama Grand Prix for his role. The series ended with a movie in 2008. In the new series, Hana Nochi Hare ~ Hanadan Next Season, that aired in 2018, he returned as Domyōuji (along with Oguri and Matsuda, two more of the original F4 members) for a one-episode guest appearance.

In 2007, Matsumoto starred in Bambino!, which won him his first Best Actor award at the 53rd Television Drama Academy Awards.

In 2008, he re-united with Bambino! co-star Karina for the drama special , which aired as part of the 24-hour Television telethon in 2008. He portrayed a man diagnosed with CIDP struggling to recuperate and return to normal life with his wife and young daughter. The drama special received a viewership rating of 25.6%.

In 2009, Matsumoto starred in his first drama series in nearly two years. He portrayed , a half-Japanese, half-Filipino young man who always faces life with a smile in the drama Smile, co-starring Oguri once more. Matsumoto subsequently won Best Actor for his role in the 13th Nikkan Sports Drama Grand Prix. Fuji TV announced on September 10, 2009, that Matsumoto would star in a three-part drama special called  scheduled to air for three consecutive days in the spring of 2010.

In January 2010, Matsumoto co-starred with the other members of Arashi in their first drama in nearly ten years in the human suspense drama special . Matsumoto portrayed , a 27-year-old motorcycle courier rider who is caught up in a building hijack. Matsumoto co-starred with Yūko Takeuchi in his first Getsuku drama titled . He also made a guest appearance on the final episode of bandmate Ohno's drama , which is based on the Fujiko Fujio's Kaibutsu-kun manga and anime series.

In 2012, co-starring with Eita Nagayama who played as Teru Nitta, Matsumoto played the role of Shuntaro Tokita in Lucky Seven, a series surrounding a group of quirky detectives.

In 2014, co-starring with Satomi Ishihara who played as Saeko Takahashi, Matsumoto played as Koyurugi Sota in the live-adaptation of romance Josei manga series Shitsuren Chocolatier.

The series is about a lawyer always eager to find the 0.1% truth in the midst of 99.9% cases in Japan, where once one is prosecuted, they are presumably guilty. Later in 2018, Matsumoto returned for the sequel titled . The sequel also experienced success like the prequel, with an average viewership of 17.6% in the Kanto region, being one of the most praised drama series in 2018. The series continued in 2021, with a special on TV  and a film , that were released on December 29 and 30, respectively.

In 2019, Matsumoto played lead role as Matsuura Takeshirō in the NHK drama special,  which was made to commemorate the 150th anniversary of the naming of Hokkaido.

By the end of 2021, Matsumoto's next drama was announced, his first co-starring role with long time friend Aya Ueto, called , airing weekly from January 20, 2022. He portrayed Chikara Nakagoshi, a stay-at-home family man, who's also a struggling writer, that neglects other duties while being concerned with the wellbeing of people around him.

Matsumoto plays the lead role in 2023 NHK Taiga drama titled , as Tokugawa Ieyasu. As his character, he appeared in a cameo role in the first minutes of the last episode of The 13 Lords of the Shogun As part of the promotion for the taiga, Matsumoto and other actors visited Okazaki City in Aichi Prefecture, and Shizuoka City and Hamamatsu City in Shizuoka Prefecture, which are the main setting of the story, in what was called "Tokai Premier Relay". He is also scheduled to participate as part of a mounted procession happening for the first time in the Hamamatsu Kite Festival on May 5, 2023.

Film
Along with future bandmate Aiba, Matsumoto appeared on the silver screen in the 1998 film .

In 2002, Arashi co-starred in their first movie together called . They came together again for its sequel  in 2004. He also starred in the film Tokyo Tower as a womanizer with a preference for older women with Junichi Okada the same year.

In 2007, Arashi starred in their third movie together Kiiroi Namida while Matsumoto was cast in the independent film Boku wa Imōto ni Koi o Suru with Nana Eikura as his co-star. He portrayed the lead character , a high school student who falls in love and develops a romantic relationship with his younger twin sister.

In 2008, Matsumoto took on his first jidaigeki role in a re-make of Akira Kurosawa's Hidden Fortress: The Last Princess, with award-winning actors Hiroshi Abe, Kippei Shiina and Masami Nagasawa. Soon after, TBS decided to end the Hana Yori Dango series through a film. Hana Yori Dango Final, which hit the big screen on June 28, 2008, in Japan, became a box office hit.

In 2013, Matsumoto Jun played the role of Okuda Kosuke in the movie 'Hidamari no Kanojo'(Her Sunny Side) along with actress Ueno Juri in the latest movie of director Miki Takahiro ('Solanin', 'Boku ga Ita').'Hidamari no Kanojo' was filmed in January and to hit cinemas in October 2013.

In 2014, Arashi once again starred in a sequel to the Pikanchi series, .

In 2017, Matsumoto Jun played the role of Takashi Hayama in the Movie 'Narratage' along with actress Kasumi Arimura.

Other ventures

TV host

From 2005 to 2007, Matsumoto along with Akiko Wada, Aya Matsuura, KAT-TUN, Tomochika, and Hinoi Team hosted Minna no Terebi/Utawara Hot Hit 10.

Radio

Matsumoto had his own radio show, Jun Style, on Nack5 from October 5, 2002, to September 2011.

Commercial spots
(CM)
 Asahi Group Holdings, Ltd.
 Asahi Soft Drinks "Mitsuya Cider" (2020) with Arashi
 Au by KDDI 
 Au by KDDI (2011)
 Android Au (2011) - co-star with all Arashi members
 Au Box (2008)
 Bandai 
  (Tamagotchi Osutchi Mesutchi) (1999)
 Daiichi Sankyo
 Lulu Attack cold medicine (2018 - 2019, 2022)
 Daio Paper 
 Elleair + Water (2010 - 2017) 
 Hitachi
 Home appliances (2010 - 2019) (By himself, and co-starring Arashi members, both as individuals and as a whole team)
 House Foods 
  (Sawayaka toiki sūpākatekin) (2004)
 Japan Airlines (2021-) With fellow Arashi member Sho Sakurai
 KFC Japan
 Pot Pie and Chicken Box (2009)
 Tomato Cream Pot Pie (2010)
 Chicken Cream Pot Pie, Tomato Cream Pot Pie with Shrimp (2011)
 Kikkoman
  (Uchi no gohan) (2017 - 2020)
 Kirin Holdings 
 Kirin Brewery
 Tanrei Green Label (2010 - 2013) - Co-star with Satoshi Ohno and Masaki Aiba (later joined by Kazunari Ninomiya and Sho Sakurai)
 Kirin Beverages
 Afternoon Tea Delicious Sugar-free (2016)
 Mets "Mets Men" (2016) - By himself and co-starring Masaki Aiba and Satoshi Ohno
 Kosé Corporation 
 Kosé Cosmetics
 Fasio (2010 - 2013)
 Kosé Cosmeport
 Je l'aime (2013 - 2020) - By himself and co-starring with Masaki Aiba
 Savon de Bouquet (2014 -)
 Meiji Seika
 Meiji Milk Chocolate (2011 - 2020)
 Meiji The Chocolate (2014)
 Crispies (2012)
 Mountain of mushrooms · Village of bamboo shoots (2013 - 2019)
 Misawa Home (1998)
 Nintendo
 Mario Cart 7 (2010)
 Mario Kart Wii (2010) - Co-star with Kazunari Ninomiya
 Donkey Kong Returns (2010) - Co-star with Sho Sakurai
 Wii Party (2010) - Co-star with all Arashi members
 3Ds
 Recruit 
 Hot Pepper Beauty (2011)
 Suumo (2022)
 Sagawa Express 
 Sagawa Express Transport and Logistics "NEXT! SAGAWA" (2022)
 Suntory 
 Pepsi Nex (2008)

Filmography

TV drama

Movies

Stage

Awards and nominations

Footnotes

References

External links
 J Storm Profile
 Jun Matsumoto | Johnny's Net Profile
 
 

1983 births
Living people
Japanese male pop singers
Japanese male idols
Arashi members
Japanese male film actors
Japanese male stage actors
Japanese male television actors
Japanese radio personalities
Japanese television personalities
Male actors from Tokyo
Japanese male dancers
Taiga drama lead actors
20th-century Japanese male actors
20th-century Japanese male singers
20th-century Japanese singers
21st-century Japanese male actors
21st-century Japanese male singers
21st-century Japanese singers